International Accounting Standard 8 Accounting Policies, Changes in Accounting Estimates and Errors or IAS 8 is an international financial reporting standard (IFRS) adopted by the International Accounting Standards Board (IASB). It prescribes the criteria for selecting and changing accounting policies, accounting for changes in estimates and reflecting corrections of prior period errors.

The standard requires compliance with IFRSs which are relevant to the specific circumstances of the entity. In a situation where no specific guidance is provided by IFRSs, IAS 8 requires management to use its judgement to develop and apply an accounting policy that is relevant and reliable. Changes in accounting policies and corrections of errors are generally accounted for retrospectively, unless this is impracticable; whereas changes in accounting estimates are generally accounted for prospectively.

IAS 8 was issued in December 1993 by the International Accounting Standards Committee, the predecessor to the IASB. It was reissued in December 2003 by the IASB.

Accounting policies
Accounting policies are the specific principles, bases, conventions, rules and practices applied by an entity in preparing and presenting financial information.

Where an IFRS specifically applies to a transaction, event or condition, the accounting policy applied to that item should be determined by reference to that standard. When no standard applies specifically to a transaction, event or condition, management should use its judgement to develop a policy that results in information that is relevant to the economic decision-making needs of users and reliable, such that the financial statements faithfully represent the financial position, performance and cashflows of the entity, reflect the economic substance of transactions, events and conditions, are free from bias, prudent, and complete in all material respects.

In making judgement, management should take into account (in the following order) the requirements in IFRSs dealing with similar and related issues, and the definitions, recognition criteria and measurement concepts for assets, liabilities, income and expenses in the Conceptual Framework. Management may also consider recent pronouncements of other standard-setting bodies, accounting literature and accepted industry practices, to the extent that these do not conflict with IFRSs and the Framework.

Accounting policies should be applied consistently for similar transactions, events or conditions, unless an IFRS requires or permits different accounting policies to be applied to different categories of items.

An entity can change an accounting policy only if it is required by an IFRS or results in the financial statements providing reliable and more relevant information. If the change is due to requirement by an IFRS, an entity shall account for the change from the initial application of the IFRS in accordance with the specific transitional provisions (i.e. the standard may specify retrospective application or only prospective application), if any. Where there are no specific transitional provisions in the IFRS requiring the change in accounting policy, or an entity changes an accounting policy voluntarily, it should apply the change retrospectively.

Where a change in accounting policy is applied retrospectively, an entity should adjust the opening balance of each affected component of equity for the earliest prior period presented and the other comparative amounts for each prior period presented as if the new accounting policy had always been applied. The standard permits exemption from this requirement when it is impracticable to determine either the period-specific effects or cumulative effect of the change.

Changes in accounting estimates
A change in accounting estimate is "an adjustment of the carrying amount of an asset or liability, or the amount of the periodic consumption of an asset, that results from the assessment of the present status of, and expected future benefits and obligations associated with, assets and liabilities. Changes in accounting estimates result from new information or new developments and, accordingly, are not correction of errors."

Changes in accounting estimates are reflected prospectively (that is, from the date of change) by including it in the income statement for the period of the change (if the change affects that period only), or the period of the change and future periods (if the change affects both). However, to the extent that a change in an accounting estimate gives rise to changes in assets and liabilities, or relates to an item of equity, it is recognised by adjusting the carrying amount of the related asset, liability, or equity item in the period of the change.

Errors
Material prior period errors are corrected retrospectively in the first financial statements issued after their discovery. Correction is made by restating the comparative amounts for the prior period(s) presented in which the error occurred. If the error occurred before the earlier comparative prior period presented, the opening balances of assets, liabilities and equity for the earliest prior period should be restated to reflect correction of the error(s).

Notes

See also
Creative accounting
Hollywood accounting
Plug (accounting)

References

External links
 IFRS Foundation Technical Summary: IAS 8 Accounting Policies, Changes in Accounting Estimates and Errors

IAS 08